H/h index may refer to:

Herfindahl index, a measure of the quantity and competition of firms in an industry
h-index, a measure of scientific research impact